Robert Theodore Stafford (August 8, 1913 – December 23, 2006) was an American politician from Vermont. In his lengthy political career, he served as the 71st governor of Vermont, a United States representative, and a U.S. Senator. A Republican, Stafford was generally considered a liberal, or "Rockefeller" Republican.

Stafford is best remembered for his staunch environmentalism, his work on higher education, and his support, as an elder statesman, for the 2000 Vermont law legalizing civil unions for gay couples.

Early life
Stafford was born in Rutland, Vermont, to Bert Linus Stafford and Mabel R. (Stratton) Stafford. Bert Stafford was a 1901 graduate of Middlebury College who practiced law in Rutland, and was President of the Rutland County National Bank. He served as Rutland County's State's Attorney, and was mayor from 1915 to 1917, President of the Vermont Bar Association in 1930, and Chairman of the Vermont Board of Education.

Stafford attended the schools of Rutland and was a 1931 graduate of Rutland High School. He received his Bachelor of Science degree from Middlebury College in 1935. While there, he joined the Delta Upsilon fraternity. He briefly attended the University of Michigan Law School before earning his LL.B. from the Boston University School of Law in 1938.

Start of career
Upon completing law school, Stafford was admitted to the bar and practiced law with the Rutland firm of Stafford, Abatiell, and Stafford.  He became active in politics as a Republican and served as Rutland's grand juror (prosecutor in the municipal court)  from 1938 to 1942.

World War II and Navy Reserve service
In 1942, Stafford joined the United States Navy Reserve for World War II and was commissioned as an ensign.  Assigned to the Intelligence branch, he completed his initial training at Dartmouth College and at Fort Dix, New Jersey.  He then carried out intelligence officer postings at the Navy Department in Washington, D.C., and at Navy bases on Cape Cod, Massachusetts.

Stafford later requested sea duty and served as senior watch officer aboard USS West Point, the Navy's largest troop transport ship.  During his service aboard West Point, the ship made numerous voyages across the Atlantic to Europe and Africa. Stafford advanced to lieutenant commander during the war, and at its end in 1945 he was the ship's chief transportation officer. He returned to Rutland in February 1946 while continuing to serve in the Navy Reserve.

In October 1951, Stafford returned to active duty during the Korean War era. He was assigned as gunnery officer aboard USS Mission Bay, a Reserve training ship berthed in Bayonne, New Jersey, and served until February 1953. He remained in the Navy Reserve after his second deployment and retired at the rank of captain in March 1971.

Continued career

Stafford served as Rutland County's State's Attorney from 1947 to 1951 and practiced law in a new firm, Stafford and LaBrake.

Following his Korean War-era deployment, he entered Vermont statewide politics, serving as deputy attorney general for the state from 1953 to 1955, and attorney general from 1955 to 1957. In 1956, he was elected lieutenant governor, and in 1958 was elected governor.

Stafford's ascent to the lieutenant governorship and governorship was unusual in that he did not follow the path of most Vermont Republicans. From the founding of the party in the 1850s, Republicans in Vermont had made use of the Mountain Rule, which called for candidates for governor and lieutenant governor to alternate between the east and west sides of the Green Mountains, and for governors to serve only two years in office.  U.S. Senators were also allocated according to the Mountain Rule, with one from the east and one from the west. Under this system, candidates for governor and lieutenant governor were chosen by the party years in advance, and served in leadership roles in the Vermont General Assembly, including Speaker of the Vermont House of Representatives and President of the Vermont Senate. Stafford is one of Vermont's few governors who did not serve in the legislature. By the late 1950s, the Democratic Party was becoming increasingly competitive in Vermont, and in the 1958 election, Stafford won the governorship over Bernard J. Leddy with only 50.3% of the vote.

In 1960, Stafford was the Republican nominee for Vermont's lone seat in the U.S. House of Representatives, supported by all factions of his party because he was regarded as the strongest challenger to Democrat William H. Meyer, who had broken the Republican Party's 100 year hold on statewide offices by winning election to Congress in 1958. Stafford won, and was subsequently reelected four times, serving in the House from January 3, 1961, to September 16, 1971. Stafford voted in favor of the Civil Rights Act of 1964, and 1968, as well as the 24th Amendment to the U.S. Constitution and the Voting Rights Act of 1965.

In September 1971, he resigned his seat in the House to accept appointment to the Senate, temporarily filling the vacancy caused by the death of Winston L. Prouty. Stafford won the January 1972 special election to serve out the rest of Prouty's term and won reelection twice including the 1976 election against outgoing Governor Thomas P. Salmon.  He served for slightly over 17 years, until his retirement in 1989. He chaired the Committee on Environment and Public Works from 1981 to 1987.

While in Congress, he helped pass a law, now known as the Robert T. Stafford Disaster Relief and Emergency Assistance Act, or Stafford Act, to coordinate federal natural disaster assistance.

Stafford's support of weapons sales to Nicaraguan contras led to the Winooski 44 protest.

As he neared retirement from the Senate, New York Times writer Philip Shabecoff wrote in a profile of Stafford that his tendency to keep his own counsel meant he "may give the worst interview of any public official in the capital." Stafford commented on his own reputation for maintaining a low profile by saying "I talked more when I was younger."

Later life
In his later years, Stafford was regarded as the elder statesman of Vermont Republicans. In 1998, Jack McMullen, a recent arrival to Vermont, declared his candidacy for the Republican nomination for U.S. Senator. As related by Chris Graff, longtime Vermont bureau chief for the Associated Press, McMullen's candidacy sustained an immediate blow when Graff interviewed Stafford about the January 1998 ice storm and other current events. During the discussion, Stafford persistently got McMullen's name wrong, calling him "Mulholland". Graff wrote that he tried to politely correct Stafford, but finally realized that Stafford's intent was to convey his opinion that McMullen was too unknown and too new to Vermont to be a viable candidate. The lede in the resulting story was that Vermont's senior Republican was of the view that McMullen had not lived in the state long enough to represent it in the senate, and Stafford's dismissal of McMullen as "Mulholland or whatever his name is" became a running joke among reporters and political operatives.

In the Republican primary, McMullen faced Fred Tuttle, a retired dairy farmer who had starred in a mock documentary film called Man with a Plan, a comedy about a retired farmer who decides to run for Vermont's seat in the United States House of Representatives. Tuttle's candidacy was partly an attempt to generate publicity for the film, and partly an attempt to mock McMullen as a carpetbagger and flatlander (Vermont slang for an out-of-stater) who had moved to Vermont only because he thought it would be easier to run for the Senate there than in more populous Massachusetts, where McMullen had previously resided. On primary day, Tuttle beat McMullen 55 percent to 45. Tuttle immediately announced his intention to vote for incumbent Democratic Senator Patrick Leahy, after which the two made several joint appearances. On election day, Leahy defeated Tuttle and several minor candidates to win reelection.

In 2000, Stafford lent credibility to Vermont's movement to allow civil unions for gay and lesbian couples. In announcing his support, Stafford remarked that if two same sex people united in love, he could see no harm to any individual or any society.

Stafford died in Rutland on December 23, 2006.  He was buried at Evergreen Cemetery in Rutland. His wife Helen Stafford died February 27, 2011, at the age of 93.

Legacy
In 1988, Congress renamed the Federal Guaranteed Student Loan program the Robert T. Stafford Student Loan program, in honor of his work on higher education.

In 2007, Congress renamed the White Rocks National Recreation Area in the State of Vermont as the Robert T. Stafford White Rocks National Recreation Area.

See also
 List of members of the American Legion

References

External links
  Retrieved on 2008-01-26

 History of the Stafford Federal Student Loan Program
 CNN Obituary for Stafford (inactive)
 Wife of late Vermont US Sen. Stafford dies at 93
 National Governors Association
 
 The Political Graveyard

1913 births
2006 deaths
20th-century American politicians
American environmentalists
United States Navy personnel of World War II
United States Navy personnel of the Korean War
Boston University School of Law alumni
Republican Party governors of Vermont
Lieutenant Governors of Vermont
Middlebury College alumni
Military personnel from Vermont
People from Rutland (city), Vermont
Republican Party United States senators from Vermont
United States Navy officers
University of Michigan Law School alumni
Vermont lawyers
State's attorneys in Vermont
Vermont Attorneys General
Republican Party members of the United States House of Representatives from Vermont
20th-century American lawyers
Burials at Evergreen Cemetery (Rutland, Vermont)